2-Nitrobenzoic acid or o-nitrobenzoic acid is an organic compound with the formula C6H4(NO2)CO2H.  It is prepared by oxidation of 2-nitrotoluene with nitric acid. In consists of a carboxylic acid group and a nitro group in the ortho configuration. Reduction of the nitro group into an amine produces anthranilic acid.

References

Benzoic acids
Nitrobenzenes